Archon is a commune in the department of Aisne in the Hauts-de-France region of northern France.

Geography
Archon is located some 60 km east by southeast of Saint-Quentin and 40 km west of Charleville-Mézières.  It can be accessed by road D744 from Cuiry-les-Iviers in the north which passes through the heart of the commune and the village then continues south to Rozoy-sur-Serre. The D520 road starts from the village and continues east to Parfondeval. The commune consists entirely of farmland, and there are no other villages or hamlets.

A stream rises in the commune and flows south joining other tributaries and feeding the Serre river.

Neighbouring communes and villages

History
In Greek Archon (ἄρχων, pl. Ἄρχοντες) means chief or lord.

Archon was known as Archium in 1124. It has been found in Mousterian flint carvings and Roman pottery. In the 13th century, the lordship was given to the Abbey Saint-Remi of Reims and Saint Vincent of Laon and to the Rozoy Chapter.

The village has beautiful old houses and barns built of Wattle and daub. Archon has a restored private castle – the Ogny Castle – built in the 16th/17th centuries. It is a square building flanked by two towers at opposite corners, a square gate, and two square towers. Former mill at Ogny is now a farm. The church of Saint Martin is fortified. The front is protected by two round towers on each side of the door and connected by a bridge with loopholes and a gatehouse.

Archon was the homeland for:
Jean d'Ongnies, the Abbot of La Valroy in 1394
Pierre Antoine Menu (1769-1844) who was born in Archon on 2 November 1769: Knight of the Legion of Honour
Marcel Cury (1891-1984) local historian, author of the Glossary of Archon, Rozoy-sur-Serre and Parfondeval

Archives
The two oldest civil status acts of Archon show baptisms in the church of St. Martin in late October 1660. The first was a girl, Jeanne Lengrene, the second child of Jacques Cury, brother of Simon Cury and Claude Mennesson. There were baptisms from 1660 to 1668.

Starting from 1668 there were marriages. The first is cited on 3 July 1668 – the marriage of Michel Dugard and Marguerite Lengrene, widower and widow, witnessed by Jean Lengrene and Claude Chollet, labourers, and Louis de Labarre.

The last burial was in January 1669. Antoinette Bouche was buried on 23 January but the precise date of death and age are not known. The witnesses were her children Jacques and François Jumelet which signifies that Antoinette was an adult and the wife of a Jumelet.

Death certificates and marriage are sometimes more informative and go back to the beginning of the 17th century and the late 16th century. Thus on 20 February 1670 Jean Robinet aged about 85 years was buried who must have been born around 1585 in the reign of Henry III.

The study of these documents helps to better trace the history of the population of Archon over 400 years and to better understand the economic and demographic changes in the village. This study is ongoing and relies on the analysis of the following data:

a) The evolution of births, marriages and deaths from 1660 to 2010 (there was a very strong population growth in the First Empire then a very sharp drop from 1850 to 1900)

b) The appearance and disappearance of surnames: Grimpret, Cury, Menu, Marchand, Lefevre were present since at least the middle of the 17th century and Vilain since the beginning of the 18th century until today. Lengrene, Mennesson, Foulon, Taute and others have not been seen in Archon for a long time.

c) Appearances and disappearances of activities (e.g. weaver, farmer, blacksmith, schoolmaster, baker)

Marital status
Registers of deeds, 1660–1699, 1700–1749, 1750–1769, 1770–1789, 1790–1800, 1801–1819 (1808 is missing) 1820–1835, 1836–1842 (reconstituted), 1843–1862, 1863–1892 (missing 1873-1882), a gap from 1893 to 1918 (except 1913, which is reconstituted), 1919–1956, 1957–1976. Tables: 1802-1952

Acts found in late 2010: 1789–1791 acts, 1793 births, Year II, Year III Deaths, Births in Year V, Year VIII Deaths, Year X Births, 2 births in 1807, 1808, 2 deaths in 1819, year 1835.

Population, social economics, Census statistics: Year IV (men over 12 years) from 1836 to 1906, 1926, 1931, 1936, 1954, 1962.

Administration
List of Successive Mayors of Archon

Mayors from 1941

Population

Sites and monuments

The Church of Saint Martin (16th century) is registered as an historical monument. It has lost two of the four towers which were originally there. The remaining towers frame the west portal. On the street is the north side which has a massive buttress and is defended by a gatehouse of brick which has a counterpart on the south side overlooking the cemetery. The church has a number of items that are registered as historical objects:
A Statue: Saint Martin (19th century)
A Statue: Virgin and child (18th century)
A set of 2 Sanctuary Lamps (19th century)
A Baptismal font (19th century)
The complete main Altar (19th century)
A set of 2 Processional Banners (19th century)
A Sacristy Cross: Christ on the Cross (18th century)
An Altar Painting: Calvary, Christ on the Cross (19th century)
A Statue: Saint Martin (18th century)
A Statuette: Virgin and child (18th century)
The Sundial from 1820 has a quote from the teacher Prévost: "The glory of the world passes like a shadow"

Notable people linked to the commune
Pierre Antoine Menu (1769-1844) Soldier of the Year II at 24 years old. After serving 22 years in Europe, he retired to Beaumé in Thiérache, Captain of infantry and Knight of the Legion of Honour. He was born in the village of Archon on 2 November 1769 into a family of weavers. From 22 April 1793 to 1 September 1815, Pierre Antoine spent his entire military career in the 84th infantry regiment of the line. Wounded by a gunshot in the right nipple on 26 July 1812 at Koukoviaczi near Vitebsk in the Battle of Ostrovno, he left the army at the fall of the Empire. He died at Beaumé on 15 January 1844. His burial stone still exists.
Marcel Cury (1891-1984), farmer and historian, author with Dr. Georges Railliet of the Glossary of Archon, Rozoy-sur-Serre and Parfondeval and numerous articles including Language of Picardy.

See also
Communes of the Aisne department

Bibliography
The fortified churches of Thiérache,  Discovery Guide / Sites of Memory, walks and tours – Coll. Country Side Story Guide – p. 27, ed. Chamina, 2006, size 14 x 21 cm, 48 pages, (selling price 2007: 6 euros),  
Glossary of Archon, Rozoy-sur-Serre and Parfondeval, Marcel Cury and Georges Railliet, Museum of Picardy, Amiens, 1965. With a folding map of the region. Collection of the Linguistics Society Picardy III. Published with The permission of CNRS. Paperback, 107 pages uncut, size 16.5 x 25 cm.
The Canton of Rozoy-sur-Serre: history, geography, biography, statistics, Isidore Philoximène Mien-Peon, typography and lithography Mourreau Jules, Saint-Quentin 1865

References

External links
Archon on the old National Geographic Institute website 
Archon on the Terascia website, specialised website on Thiérache, with many photos. 
Bell Towers website 
Archon on Géoportail, National Geographic Institute (IGN) website 
Archon on the 1750 Cassini Map

Communes of Aisne